Ricardo Soares Florêncio, known as Russo (born 16 June 1976 in Olinda), is a retired Brazilian footballer who played as a defender.

At club level, Russo played for Sport, Vitória, Cruzeiro, Botafogo, Santos, São Caetano, Santos and Spartak Moscow.

He won the FIFA Confederations Cup with the Brazilian squad in 1997, but did not feature in any matches.

He played 1 game in the 2003–04 UEFA Cup for FC Spartak Moscow.

References

1976 births
Living people
1997 FIFA Confederations Cup players
Brazilian footballers
Brazil international footballers
Brazilian expatriate footballers
Expatriate footballers in Russia
Sport Club do Recife players
Esporte Clube Vitória players
Cruzeiro Esporte Clube players
Botafogo Futebol Clube (SP) players
Santos FC players
Associação Desportiva São Caetano players
CR Vasco da Gama players
FC Spartak Moscow players
Russian Premier League players
Santa Cruz Futebol Clube players
People from Olinda
Association football defenders
1998 CONCACAF Gold Cup players
Sportspeople from Pernambuco